Vestry House Museum is a history museum in Walthamstow focusing on the heritage of the local area. The collection includes various artefacts dating from the Victorian era to the 20th century, including numerous archived documents and photographs.

Vestry House was originally built as a workhouse and was later used as a police station and also as private housing (amongst the exhibits is a replica police cell demonstrating one of the building's previous uses). The building became a museum in 1931.

On permanent display in the museum is the Bremer Car, the first British motor car with an internal combustion engine, which was built by Frederick Bremer (1872–1941) in a workshop at the back of his family home in Connaught Road, Walthamstow. The car first ran in 1892 and was donated to the museum by Bremer in 1933.

References 

Residential buildings completed in 1730
History of the London Borough of Waltham Forest
Local museums in London
Museums in the London Borough of Waltham Forest
Walthamstow
18th-century architecture in the United Kingdom
Grade II listed buildings in the London Borough of Waltham Forest